The 2008 Colorado Crush season is the sixth season for the franchise. The Crush finished the regular season with a 6–10 record, good enough for the playoffs as the 5th seed in the American Conference. In the Wild Card round, they defeated division rival Utah, 49–44. In the Divisional round, they were defeated by the defending champions, the San Jose SaberCats, 51–64.

Standings

Regular season schedule

Playoff schedule

Coaching

Final roster

Stats

Regular season

Week 1: vs. Columbus Destroyers

Week 2
Bye Week

Week 3: at Dallas Desperados

Week 4: at Chicago Rush

Week 5: vs. New Orleans VooDoo

Week 6: vs. Los Angeles Avengers

Week 7: at Cleveland Gladiators

Week 8: at Kansas City Brigade

Week 9: vs. Chicago Rush

Week 10: vs. Grand Rapids Rampage

Week 11: at Utah Blaze

Week 12: vs. Cleveland Gladiators

Week 13: at San Jose SaberCats

Week 14: vs. New York Dragons

Week 15: at Grand Rapids Rampage

Week 16: at Arizona Rattlers

Week 17: vs. Kansas City Brigade

Playoffs

American Conference Wild Card: at (4) Utah Blaze

American Conference Divisional: at (2) San Jose SaberCats

Colorado Crush
Colorado Crush seasons